Ural Ufa – is a Russian professional men's volleyball club, based in Ufa, playing in Russian Volleyball Super League since 1996.

Achievements
 CEV Challenge Cup
Runners-up (1): 2013
 Russian Championship
Runners-up (1): 2013

Team roster

2015/2016
Head coach:  Boris Grebennikov

Notable players
Notable, former or current players of club, who are medalist of intercontinental tournaments in national teams or clubs.

References 
 Official site 

Russian volleyball clubs
Volleyball clubs established in 1992
1992 establishments in Russia
Sport in Ufa